Hindu philosophy encompasses the philosophies, world views and teachings of Hinduism that emerged in Ancient India which include six systems (shad-darśana) – Samkhya, Yoga, Nyaya, Vaisheshika, Mimamsa and Vedanta. In Indian tradition, the word used for philosophy is Darshana (Viewpoint or perspective), from the Sanskrit root  ('to see, to experience').

These are also called the Astika philosophical traditions and are those that accept the Vedas as an authoritative, important source of knowledge. Ancient and medieval India was also the source of philosophies that share philosophical concepts but rejected the Vedas, and these have been called  (heterodox or non-orthodox) Indian philosophies. Nāstika Indian philosophies include Buddhism, Jainism, Chārvāka, Ājīvika, and others.

Western scholars have debated the relationship and differences within āstika philosophies and with nāstika philosophies, starting with the writings of Indologists and Orientalists of the 18th and 19th centuries, which were themselves derived from limited availability of Indian literature and medieval doxographies. The various sibling traditions included in Hindu philosophies are diverse, and they are united by shared history and concepts, same textual resources, similar ontological and soteriological focus, and cosmology. While Buddhism and Jainism are considered distinct philosophies and religions, some heterodox (nāstika) traditions such as Cārvāka are often considered as distinct schools within Hindu philosophy because the word Hindu is also an exonym and historically, the term has also been used as a geographical and cultural identifier for people living in the Indian subcontinent.

Hindu philosophy also includes several sub-schools of theistic philosophies that integrate ideas from two or more of the six orthodox philosophies, such as the realism of the Nyāya, the naturalism of the Vaiśeṣika, the dualism of the Sāṅkhya, the non-dualism and knowledge of Self as essential to liberation of Advaita, the self-discipline of Yoga and the asceticism and elements of theistic ideas. Examples of such schools include Pāśupata Śaiva, Śaiva siddhānta, Pratyabhijña, Raseśvara and Vaiṣṇava. Some sub-schools share Tantric ideas with those found in some Buddhist traditions. The ideas of these sub-schools are found in the Puranas and Āgamas.

Each school of Hindu philosophy has extensive epistemological literature called Pramana, as well as theories on metaphysics, axiology, and other topics.

Classifications

In the history of India, the six orthodox schools had emerged before the start of the Common Era, and some schools emerged possibly even before the Buddha. Some scholars have questioned whether the orthodox and heterodox schools classification is sufficient or accurate, given the diversity and evolution of views within each major school of Indian philosophy, with some sub-schools combining heterodox and orthodox views.

Since ancient times, Indian philosophy has been categorized into  and  schools of thought. The orthodox schools of Indian philosophy have been called  ('six systems'). This schema was created between the 12th and 16th centuries by Vedantins. It was then adopted by the early Western Indologists, and pervades modern understandings of Indian philosophy.

Āstika
There are six  (orthodox) schools of thought. Each is called a darśana, and each darśana accepts the Vedas as authority. Each  also accepts the premise that Atman (eternal Self) exists. The  schools of philosophy are:
 Samkhya – A strongly dualist theoretical exposition of consciousness and matter.  Agnostic with respect to God or the gods.
 Yoga – A monotheistic school which emerged from Sankhya and emphasizes practical use of Sankhya theory: meditation, contemplation and liberation.
 Nyaya or logic – The school of epistemology which explores sources of knowledge. 
 Vaisheshika – An empiricist school of atomism.
 Mīmāṃsā – An anti-ascetic and anti-mysticist school of orthopraxy. This school deals with the correct interpretation of the verses in Vedas.
Vedanta is also referred as Uttara-Mimamsa. Vedānta came to be the dominant current of Hinduism in the post-medieval period.

Nāstika

Schools that do not accept the authority of the Vedas are nāstika philosophies, of which four  (heterodox) schools are prominent:
 Charvaka, a materialism school that accepted the existence of free will.
 Ājīvika, a materialism school that denied the existence of free will.
 Buddhism, a philosophy that denies existence of ātman (Self) and is based on the teachings and enlightenment of Gautama Buddha.
 Jainism, a philosophy that accepts the existence of the ātman (Self), and is based on the teachings and enlightenment of twenty-four teachers known as tirthankaras, with Rishabha as the first and Mahavira as the twenty-fourth.

Other schools
Besides the major orthodox and non-orthodox schools, there have existed syncretic sub-schools that have combined ideas and introduced new ones of their own. The medieval scholar Madhavacharya, identified by some as Vidyaranya, in his book 'Sarva-Darsana-Sangraha', includes the following, along with Buddhism and Jainism, as sub-schools of Hindu philosophy:
 Pashupata Shaivism, developed by Nakulisa
 Shaiva Siddhanta, the theistic Sankhya school
 Pratyabhijña, the recognitive school of Kashmir Shaivism, Trika
 Raseśvara, a Shaiva school that advocated the use of mercury to reach immortality
 The Ramanuja school
 The Pūrṇaprājña (Madhvācārya) school
 The Pāṇinīya

The above sub-schools introduced their own ideas while adopting concepts from orthodox schools of Hindu philosophy such as realism of the Nyāya, naturalism of Vaiśeṣika, monism and knowledge of Self (Atman) as essential to liberation of Advaita, self-discipline of Yoga, asceticism and elements of theistic ideas. Some sub-schools share Tantric ideas with those found in some Buddhist traditions.

Characteristics

Overview

Epistemology

Epistemology is called pramana. It has been a key, much debated field of study in Hinduism since ancient times.  is a Hindu theory of knowledge and discusses the valid means by which human beings can gain accurate knowledge.

Ancient and medieval Hindu texts identify six  as correct means of accurate knowledge and truths: 
  – Direct perception 
  – Inference or indirect perception
  – Comparison and analogy 
  – Postulation, derivation from circumstances 
  – Non-perception, absence of proof 
  – Word, testimony of past or present reliable experts

Each of these are further categorized in terms of conditionality, completeness, confidence and possibility of error, by the different schools. The schools vary on how many of these six are valid paths of knowledge. For example, the Cārvāka nāstika philosophy holds that only one (perception) is an epistemically reliable means of knowledge, the Samkhya school holds that three are (perception, inference and testimony), while the Mīmāṃsā and Advaita schools hold that all six are epistemically useful and reliable means to knowledge.

Sāmkhya

Samkhya is the oldest of the orthodox philosophical systems in Hinduism, with origins in the 1st millennium BCE. It is a rationalist school of Indian philosophy, and had a strong influence on other schools of Indian philosophies. Sāmkhya is an enumerationist philosophy whose epistemology accepted three of six pramāṇas as the only reliable means of gaining knowledge.

Samkhya school espouses dualism between witness-consciousness and 'nature' (mind, perception, matter). It regards the universe as consisting of two realities: Puruṣa (witness-consciousness) and prakriti ('nature'). The universe is described by this school as one created by Purusa-Prakriti entities infused with various permutations and combinations of variously enumerated elements, senses, feelings, activity and mind.

Samkhya philosophy includes a theory of gunas (qualities, innate tendencies, psyche). , it states, are of three types:  being good, compassionate, illuminating, positive, and constructive;  is one of activity, chaotic, passion, impulsive, potentially good or bad; and  being the quality of darkness, ignorance, destructive, lethargic, negative. Everything, all life forms and human beings, state Samkhya scholars, have these three , but in different proportions. The interplay of these  defines the character of someone or something, of nature and determines the progress of life. Samkhya theorises a pluralism of Selfs who possess consciousness. Samkhya has historically been theistic or non-theistic, and there has been debate about its specific view on God.

The Samkhya karika, one of the key texts of this school of Hindu philosophy, opens by stating its goal to be "three kinds of human suffering" and means to prevent them. The text then presents a distillation of its theories on epistemology, metaphysics, axiology and soteriology. For example, it states,

The soteriology in Samkhya aims at the realization of Puruṣa as distinct from Prakriti; this knowledge of the Self is held to end transmigration and lead to absolute freedom (kaivalya).

Yoga

In Indian philosophy, Yoga is, among other things, the name of one of the six  philosophical schools. The Yoga philosophical system aligns closely with the dualist premises of the Samkhya school. The Yoga school accepts Samkhya psychology and metaphysics, but is considered theistic because it accepts the concept of personal god (Ishvara), unlike Samkhya.

The universe is conceptualized as a duality in Yoga school: puruṣa (witness-consciousness) and prakṛti (mind, perception, matter); however, the Yoga school discusses this concept more generically as "seer, experiencer" and "seen, experienced" than the Samkhya school.

A key text of the Yoga school is the Yoga Sutras of Patanjali. Patanjali may have been, as Max Müller explains, "the author or representative of the Yoga-philosophy without being necessarily the author of the Sutras." Hindu philosophy recognizes many types of Yoga, such as rāja yoga, jñāna yoga, karma yoga, bhakti yoga, tantra yoga, mantra yoga, laya yoga, and hatha yoga.

The Yoga school builds on the Samkhya school theory that jñāna (knowledge) is a sufficient means to moksha. It suggests that systematic techniques/practice (personal experimentation) combined with Samkhya's approach to knowledge is the path to moksha. Yoga shares several central ideas with Advaita Vedanta, with the difference that Yoga is a form of experimental mysticism while Advaita Vedanta is a form of monistic personalism. Like Advaita Vedanta, the Yoga school of Hindu philosophy holds that liberation/freedom in this life is achievable, and that this occurs when an individual fully understands and realizes the equivalence of Atman (Self) and Brahman.

Vaiśeṣika

The Vaiśeṣika philosophy is a naturalist school. It is a form of atomism in natural philosophy. Knowledge and liberation are achievable by complete understanding of the world of experience, according to Vaiśeṣika school. The Vaiśeṣika  is credited to Kaṇāda Kaśyapa from the second half of the first millennium BCE. The foundational text, the Vaiśeṣika Sūtra, opens as follows:

The Vaiśeṣika school is related to the Nyāya school but features differences in its epistemology, metaphysics and ontology. The epistemology of the Vaiśeṣika school, like Buddhism, accepted only two means to knowledge as reliable – perception and inference. The Vaiśeṣika school and Buddhism both consider their respective scriptures as indisputable and valid means to knowledge, the difference being that the scriptures held to be a valid and reliable source by Vaiśeṣikas were the Vedas.

Vaiśeṣika metaphysical premises are founded on a form of atomism, that reality is composed of four substances (earth, water, air, and fire). Each of these four are of two types: atomic and composite. An atom is, according to Vaiśeṣika scholars, that which is indestructible, indivisible, and has a special kind of dimension, called "small". A composite, in this philosophy, is defined to be anything which is divisible into atoms. Whatever human beings perceive is composite, while atoms are invisible.

Nyāya

The Nyāya school is a realist āstika philosophy. The school's most significant contributions to Indian philosophy were its systematic development of the theory of logic, methodology, and its treatises on epistemology. The foundational text of the Nyāya school is the Nyāya Sūtras of the first millennium BCE. The text is credited to Aksapada Gautama and its composition is variously dated between the sixth and second centuries BCE.

In its metaphysics, the Nyāya school is closer to the Vaiśeṣika school than the others. It holds that human suffering results from mistakes/defects produced by activity under wrong knowledge (notions and ignorance). Moksha (liberation), it states, is gained through right knowledge. This premise led Nyāya to concern itself with epistemology, that is, the reliable means to gain correct knowledge and to remove wrong notions. False knowledge is not merely ignorance to Naiyayikas; it includes delusion. Correct knowledge is discovering and overcoming one's delusions, and understanding the true nature of the soul, self and reality. The Nyāya Sūtras begin:

Mīmāṃsā

The Mīmāṃsā school emphasized hermeneutics and exegesis. It is a form of philosophical realism. Key texts of the Mīmāṃsā school are the Purva Mimamsa Sutras of Jaimini.

The Mīmāṃsā school has several sub-schools defined by epistemology. The Kumārila Bhaṭṭa sub-school of Mīmāṃsā added a sixth way of knowing to its canon of reliable epistemology:  (non-perception, negative/cognitive proof).

The metaphysics of the Mīmāṃsā school consists of both atheistic and theistic doctrines, and the school showed little interest in systematic examination of the existence of God. Rather, it held that the Self (Atma) is an eternal, omnipresent, inherently active spiritual essence, then focussed on the epistemology and metaphysics of dharma. To them, dharma meant rituals and duties, not devas (gods), because devas existed only in name. The Mīmāṃsākas held that the Vedas are "eternal authorless infallible", that Vedic  (injunctions) and mantras in rituals are prescriptive  (actions), and that the rituals are of primary importance and merit. They considered the Upanishads and other texts related to self-knowledge and spirituality to be of secondary importance, a philosophical view that the Vedanta school disagreed with.

Mīmāṃsā gave rise to the study of philology and the philosophy of language. While their deep analysis of language and linguistics influenced other schools, their views were not shared by others. Mīmāṃsākas considered the purpose and power of language was to clearly prescribe the proper, correct and right. In contrast, Vedantins extended the scope and value of language as a tool to also describe, develop and derive. Mīmāṃsākas considered orderly, law-driven, procedural life as the central purpose and noblest necessity of dharma and society, and divine (theistic) sustenance means to that end. The Mimamsa school was influential and foundational to the Vedanta school, with the difference that Mīmāṃsā developed and emphasized  (the portion of the śruti which relates to ceremonial acts and sacrificial rites, the early parts of the Vedas), while the Vedanta school developed and emphasized  (the portion of the Vedas which relates to knowledge of monism, the latter parts of the Vedas).

Vedānta
The Vedanta school built upon the teachings of the Upanishads and Brahma Sutras from the first millennium BCE and is the most developed and best-known of the Hindu schools. All of these have been further categorized by each sub-school of Vedanta in terms of conditionality, completeness, confidence and possibility of error.

These included metaphysical concepts such as ātman and Brahman, and an emphasis on meditation, self-discipline, self-knowledge and abstract spirituality, rather than ritualism. The Upanishads were variously interpreted by ancient- and medieval-era Vedanta scholars. Consequently, the Vedanta separated into many sub-schools, ranging from theistic dualism to non-theistic monism, each interpreting the texts in its own way and producing its own series of sub-commentaries.

Advaita

Advaita literally means "not two, sole, unity". It is a sub-school of Vedanta, and asserts spiritual and universal non-dualism. Its metaphysics is a form of absolute monism, that is all ultimate reality is interconnected oneness. This is the oldest and most widely acknowledged Vedantic school. The foundational texts of this school are the Brahma Sutras and the early Upanishads from the 1st millennium BCE. Its first great consolidator was the 8th century scholar Adi Shankara, who continued the line of thought of the Upanishadic teachers, and that of his teacher's teacher Gaudapada. He wrote extensive commentaries on the major Vedantic scriptures and is celebrated as one of the major Hindu philosophers from whose doctrines the main currents of modern Indian thought are derived.

According to this school of Vedanta, all reality is Brahman, and there exists nothing whatsoever which is not Brahman. Its metaphysics includes the concept of māyā and ātman.  connotes "that which exists, but is constantly changing and thus is spiritually unreal". The empirical reality is considered as always changing and therefore "transitory, incomplete, misleading and not what it appears to be". Advaita Vedantins assert that ātman is same as Brahman, and this Brahman is reflected within each human being and all life, all living beings are spiritually interconnected, and there is oneness in all of existence.

Viśiṣṭādvaita

Ramanuja (c. 1037–1137) was the foremost proponent of the philosophy of Viśiṣṭādvaita or qualified non-dualism. Viśiṣṭādvaita advocated the concept of a Supreme Being with essential qualities or attributes. Viśiṣṭādvaitins argued against the Advaitin conception of Brahman as an impersonal empty oneness. They saw Brahman as an eternal oneness, but also as the source of all creation, which was omnipresent and actively involved in existence. To them the sense of subject-object perception was illusory and a sign of ignorance. However, the individual's sense of self was not a complete illusion since it was derived from the universal beingness that is Brahman. Ramanuja saw Vishnu as a personification of Brahman.

Dvaita
Dvaita refers to a theistic sub-school in Vedanta tradition of Hindu philosophy. The Dvaita Vedanta school believes that God (Vishnu, Paramatman) and the individual Selfs (Atman) (jīvātman) exist as independent realities, and these are distinct.

Dvaita Vedanta is a dualistic interpretation of the Vedas; it espouses dualism by theorizing the existence of two separate realities. The first and the only independent reality, states the Dvaita school, is that of Vishnu or Brahman. Vishnu is the Paramatman, in a manner similar to monotheistic God in other major religions. The distinguishing factor of Dvaita philosophy, as opposed to monistic Advaita Vedanta, is that God takes on a personal role and is seen as a real eternal entity that governs and controls the universe. Like Vishishtadvaita Vedanta subschool, Dvaita philosophy also embraced Vaishnavism, with the metaphysical concept of Brahman in the Vedas identified with Vishnu and the one and only Supreme Being. However, unlike Vishishtadvaita which envisions ultimate qualified nondualism, the dualism of Dvaita was permanent.

Salvation, in Dvaita, is achievable only through the grace of God Vishnu.

Dvaitādvaita (Bhedabheda)
Dvaitādvaita was proposed by Nimbarka, a 13th-century Vaishnava philosopher from the Andhra region. According to this philosophy there are three categories of existence: Brahman, Self, and matter. Self and matter are different from Brahman in that they have attributes and capacities different from Brahman. Brahman exists independently, while Self and matter are dependent. Thus Self and matter have an existence that is separate yet dependent. Further, Brahman is a controller, the Self is the enjoyer, and matter the thing enjoyed. Also, the highest object of worship is Krishna and his consort Radha, attended by thousands of gopis; of the Vrindavan; and devotion consists in self-surrender.

Śuddhādvaita
Śuddhādvaita is the "purely non-dual" philosophy propounded by Vallabha Acharya (1479–1531). The founding philosopher was also the guru of the Vallabhā sampradāya ("tradition of Vallabh") or Puṣṭimārga, a Vaishnava tradition focused on the worship of Krishna. Vallabhacharya enunciates that Brahman has created the world without connection with any external agency such as Māyā (which itself is His power) and manifests Himself through the world. That is why Shuddhadvaita is known as "Unmodified transformation" or "Avikṛta Pariṇāmavāda". Brahman or Ishvara desired to become many, and he became the multitude of individual Selfs and the world. The Jagat or Maya is not false or illusionary, the physical material world is. Vallabha recognises Brahman as the whole and the individual as a "part" (but devoid of bliss) like sparks and fire.

Acintya Bheda Abheda

Chaitanya Mahaprabhu (1486–1534), stated that the Self or energy of God is both distinct and non-distinct from God, whom he identified as Krishna, Govinda, and that this, although unthinkable, may be experienced through a process of loving devotion (bhakti). He followed the Dvaita concept of Madhvacharya. This philosophy of "inconceivable oneness and difference".

Cārvāka

The Cārvāka school is one of the nāstika or "heterodox" philosophies . It rejects supernaturalism, emphasizes materialism and philosophical skepticism, holding empiricism, perception and conditional inference as the proper source of knowledge Cārvāka is an atheistic school of thought. It holds that there is neither afterlife nor rebirth, all existence is mere combination of atoms and substances, feelings and mind are an epiphenomenon, and free will exists.

Bṛhaspati is sometimes referred to as the founder of Cārvāka (also called Lokayata) philosophy. Much of the primary literature of Carvaka, the Barhaspatya sutras (ca. 600 BCE), however, are missing or lost. Its theories and development has been compiled from historic secondary literature such as those found in the shastras, sutras and the Indian epic poetry as well as from the texts of Buddhism and from Jain literature. The  by the skeptic philosopher Jayarāśi Bhaṭṭa has been considered by many scholars to be an unorthodox Cārvāka text.

One of the widely studied principles of Cārvāka philosophy was its rejection of inference as a means to establish valid, universal knowledge, and metaphysical truths. In other words, the Cārvāka epistemology states that whenever one infers a truth from a set of observations or truths, one must acknowledge doubt; inferred knowledge is conditional.

Shaivism

Early history of Shaivism is difficult to determine. However, the  Upanishad (400 – 200 BCE) is considered to be the earliest textual exposition of a systematic philosophy of Shaivism. Shaivism is represented by various philosophical schools, including non-dualist, dualist, and non-dualist-with-dualist perspectives. Vidyaranya in his works mentions three major schools of Shaiva thought: Pashupata Shaivism, Shaiva Siddhanta and Pratyabhijña (Kashmir Shaivism).

Pāśupata Shaivism
Pāśupata Shaivism ('of Paśupati') is the oldest of the major Shaiva schools. The philosophy of Pashupata sect was systematized by Lakulish in the 2nd century CE. Paśu in Paśupati refers to the effect (or created world), the word designates that which is dependent on something ulterior. Pashupatas disapproved of Vaishnava theology, known for its doctrine servitude of Selfs to the Supreme Being, on the grounds that dependence upon anything could not be the means of cessation of pain and other desired ends. They recognised that those depending upon another and longing for independence will not be emancipated because they still depend upon something other than themselves. According to Pāśupatas, Self possesses the attributes of the Supreme Deity when it becomes liberated from the 'germ of every pain'.

Pāśupatas divided the created world into the insentient and the sentient. The insentient was the unconscious and thus dependent on the sentient or conscious. The insentient was further divided into effects and causes. The effects were of ten kinds, the earth, four elements and their qualities, colour etc. The causes were of thirteen kinds, the five organs of cognition, the five organs of action, the three internal organs, intellect, the ego principle and the cognising principle. These insentient causes were held responsible for the illusive identification of Self with non-Self. Salvation in Pāśupata involved the union of the Self with God through the intellect.

Shaiva Siddhanta
Considered normative Tantric Shaivism, Shaiva Siddhanta provides the normative rites, cosmology and theological categories of Tantric Shaivism. Being a dualistic philosophy, the goal of Shaiva Siddhanta is to become an ontologically distinct Shiva (through Shiva's grace). This tradition later merged with the Tamil Saiva movement and expression of concepts of Shaiva Siddhanta can be seen in the bhakti poetry of the Nayanars.

Kashmir Shaivism
Kashmir Shaivism arose during the eighth or ninth century CE in Kashmir and made significant strides, both philosophical and theological, until the end of the twelfth century CE. It is categorised by various scholars as monistic idealism (absolute idealism, theistic monism, realistic idealism, transcendental physicalism or concrete monism). It is a school of Śaivism consisting of Trika and its philosophical articulation Pratyabhijña.

Even though, both Kashmir Shaivism and Advaita Vedanta are non-dual philosophies which give primacy to Universal Consciousness ( or Brahman), in Kashmir Shavisim, as opposed to Advaita, all things are a manifestation of this Consciousness. This implies that from the point of view of Kashmir Shavisim, the phenomenal world is real, and it exists and has its being in Consciousness. However, Advaita holds that Brahman is the reality (pure consciousness) and it is inactive and the phenomenal world is an appearance. The objective of human life, according to Kashmir Shaivism, is to merge in Shiva or Universal Consciousness, or to realize one's already existing identity with Shiva, by means of wisdom, yoga and grace.

See also

 Āstika and nāstika
 Buddhism and Hinduism
 Buddhist philosophy
 Hindu idealism
 Hindu denominations
 Pramana
 Indian philosophy
 Kashmir Shaivism
 Metaphilosophy
 Dharma
 Asrama
 Vedas
 Origin of language

Notes

References

Bibliography

 
 
 
 
 
 
 
 
 
 
  Reprint edition; Originally published under the title of The Six Systems of Indian Philosophy.

Further reading
  Vol. 1 | Vol. 2 | Vol. 3 | Vol. 4 | Vol. 5.
 
 
 Radhakrishnan, Sarvepalli;  and Moore, Charles A. A Source Book in Indian Philosophy.  Princeton University Press; 1957. Princeton paperback 12th edition, 1989. .
 Rambachan, Anantanand. "The Advaita Worldview: God, World and Humanity." 2006.
 Zilberman, David B., The Birth of Meaning in Hindu Thought.  D. Reidel Publishing Company, Dordrecht, Holland, 1988.  .  Chapter 1.  "Hindu Systems of Thought as Epistemic Disciplines".

External links